Jake Matthew Hull (born 22 October 2001) is an English professional footballer who plays for Buxton, on loan from Rotherham United, as a defender.

Career
Born in Sheffield, Hull began his career at Rotherham United, signing his first professional contract in August 2020. He joined Matlock Town on a two-month youth loan on 25 September 2020, but returned in October after just one month, despite impressing. On 20 April 2021, he signed a new contract, keeping him with Rotherham until June 2022.

He scored on his senior debut for Rotherham in the EFL Trophy on 7 September 2021 in a 6–0 win against Doncaster Rovers. He moved to Guiseley on loan in August 2021, returning to Rotherham in January 2022. He moved on loan to Hartlepool United later that month.

In September 2022, Hull joined Boston United on a one-month loan deal.

In February 2023, Hull was loaned to Buxton on a deal that covered the remainder of the 2022–23 season.

Career statistics

References

2001 births
Living people
English footballers
Rotherham United F.C. players
Matlock Town F.C. players
Guiseley A.F.C. players
Hartlepool United F.C. players
Boston United F.C. players
Buxton F.C. players
Northern Premier League players
National League (English football) players
Association football defenders
English Football League players
Footballers from Sheffield